Friedrich W. "Fred" Steinfort (born November 3, 1952) is a former American football placekicker in the National Football League (NFL) who played for five different teams from (1976–1983).  He played college football at Boston College.

When Steinfort won the Oakland Raiders' kicking job just before the start of the 1976 NFL season, he sent the NFL’s current all-time leading scorer, George Blanda with 2,002 points, into retirement. In 1979, when he assumed the same role with the Denver Broncos, it was Jim Turner, at that time the NFL’s third-leading scorer with 1,439 points that he displaced.

External links
Boston College Eagles bio

References 

1953 births
Living people
German players of American football
American football placekickers
Boston College Eagles football players
Oakland Raiders players
Atlanta Falcons players
Denver Broncos players
Buffalo Bills players
New England Patriots players
Brighton High School (Brighton, Massachusetts) alumni